Thereuopodina is a genus of centipedes in the family Scutigeridae. It was described by German myriapodologist Karl Wilhelm Verhoeff in 1905.

Species
There are three valid species:
 Thereuopodina adjutrix Verhoeff, 1936
 Thereuopodina queenslandica Verhoeff, 1925
 Thereuopodina tenuicornis Verhoeff, 1905

References

 

 
 
Centipede genera
Animals described in 1905
Taxa named by Karl Wilhelm Verhoeff